Barbara Helen Fried (born 1951) is an American lawyer who is currently the William W. and Gertrude H. Saunders Professor of Law at Stanford Law School.

Education 

She graduated from Harvard College with both a B.A. degree magna cum laude in English and American Literature in 1977 and an M.A. degree in Literature in 1980, as well as a J.D. degree magna cum laude in 1983 from Harvard Law School. Fried served from 1983 to 1984 as a judicial law clerk under J. Edward Lumbard, Senior Judge of the United States Court of Appeals for the Second Circuit.

Career
Fried joined the Stanford Law School Faculty in 1987 after working as an associate attorney at the law firm Paul, Weiss, Rifkind, Wharton & Garrison from 1984 to 1987.  She has investigated such topics as contractualism, libertarianism, and utilitarianism.

Fried has written about effective altruism and moral philosopher Peter Singer. She has offered critiques on philosopher Robert Nozick's theory of property and psychologist John Money's work on "fetally androgenized girls."

Activism
She is a co-founder of the political fundraising organization Mind the Gap, which advocates for Democratic Party candidates and funds get-out-the-vote groups. In 2018, Fried donated $75,000 to Mind the Gap.  Mind the Gap was described by Vox Media as "Silicon Valley's secretive donor group" in January 2020. In November 2022, Fried stepped down from her position with Mind the Gap.

Personal life
Fried is married to fellow Stanford law professor Joseph Bankman. She is the mother of Sam Bankman-Fried, the indicted founder and former CEO of now-bankrupt crypto exchange FTX, and his younger brother, Gabe.  Barbara and Joseph Bankman are signatories to a beach-front Bahamas residence, purchased as a “vacation home” for $16.4 million, that is part of the FTX bankruptcy.

Fried's sister Linda P. Fried is the Dean of Columbia University's Mailman School of Public Health.

Published works
Fried is the author of Facing Up to Scarcity: The Logic and Limits of Nonconsequentialist Thought (2020), and "Can Contractualism Save Us from Aggregation?"

References

Living people
Stanford Law School faculty
American lawyers
Harvard College alumni
American Jews
Harvard Law School alumni
Women lawyers
1951 births